Barfussia platyrhachis is a species of flowering plant in the genus Barfussia. This species is native to Colombia, Peru, and Ecuador.

Cultivars
 Tillandsia 'Creation'
 Tillandsia 'Hercules'

References

Tillandsioideae
Flora of South America
Epiphytes
Plants described in 1896